Lelio Colaneri (born April 7, 1917 in San Vito Romano) was an Italian professional football player.

1917 births
Year of death missing
Italian footballers
Serie A players
Juventus F.C. players
U.S. Salernitana 1919 players
Association football midfielders
S.S. Maceratese 1922 players
A.S.D. La Biellese players
A.S.D. Fanfulla players